Anoplocis is a genus of tree-fungus beetle in the family Ciidae.

The genus was first described by Arthur Mills Lea in 1913.

Species
 Anoplocis poriae Nakane & Nobuchi, 1955
 Anoplocis quadridentatus Kawanabe, 1996

References

Ciidae genera
Taxa named by Arthur Mills Lea